Ileana Sărăroiu (25 September 1936, Valea Voievozilor, Dâmbovița – 12 May 1979, Unirea, Călărași) was a renowned Romanian singer of traditional and popular folk music, one of the most important Romanian female folk singers. Her masterpieces, according to Romanian experts, are: "Doi voinici din Valea Mare" (Two Handsome Lads from the Valea Mare) and "Unde e Târgoviștea" (Where is Târgoviște?). The first is a song about two lads who go hunting and encounter two sisters whom they end up marrying. The second is the story of a sad old mother who waits for her son in a train station. She does not see anybody come except a girl who she has never seen before; the girl turns out to be the wife of her son.

While singing at a wedding reception, Ileana Sărăroiu suddenly collapsed and died from a brain aneurysm in 1979 at the age of 42.

Songs
Doi voinici din Valea Mare (Two handsome lads from Valea Mare)
 (Where is Târgoviște?)
Vrei să ne-ntâlnim sâmbătă seară? (Do you want to meet on Saturday evening?)
Cine-a pus cârciuma în drum... (Who made the pub on the road...)
Inimioara cu dor mult (Little heart with much longing)
 (Tonight we will be partying till morning)
Da-ar naiba in tine dragoste (Love, be damned!)
 (You green leaf, wheat ear)
Fir-ar ceasu' afurisit (That hour, be doomed!)
Pasarica, muta-ti cuibul (Little Bird, move your nest!)
De ce oare eu te-am cunoscut (Why did I ever meet you?)
Inima de dor nu stii (Heart, you don't know the longing)
Inima... (Heart...)

References

1936 births
1979 deaths
20th-century Romanian women singers
20th-century Romanian singers
Neurological disease deaths in Romania
Deaths from intracranial aneurysm